The IBSF World Under-21 Snooker Championship (also known as the World Amateur Under-21 Snooker Championship) is the premier non-professional junior snooker tournament in the world. The event series is sanctioned by the International Billiards and Snooker Federation and started from 1987.

Four winners of this championship subsequently became world professional champion (Ken Doherty, Peter Ebdon, Ronnie O'Sullivan, Neil Robertson)

Winners

Men's finals

Champions by country

Women's finals

Champions by country

See also
 World Snooker Tour
 IBSF World Snooker Championship
 IBSF World Under-18 Snooker Championship
 World Open Under-16 Snooker Championships

References 

Snooker amateur competitions
Recurring sporting events established in 1987
1987 establishments in England
World championships in snooker
Under-21 sport